Cornerstone Christian School (CCS) is a private Christian school in Camarillo, California. The school provides instruction from preschool through eighth grade. CCS was established in 1981 as a K–12 school; high school grades were dropped in 2011 due to falling enrollment. The school is accredited by the Association of Christian Schools International and the Western Association of Schools and Colleges.

Athletics
Cornerstone Christian School's athletic teams were nicknamed the Eagles. During its history as a high school, CCS was a member of the CIF Southern Section (CIF-SS) and competed in small-school conferences such as the Condor and Omega leagues. The school earned a total of six  titles including back-to-back section championships in girls' volleyball (1996, 1997), softball (1998, 1999), and baseball (2009, 2010). Cornerstone Christian dropped athletics in 2010 due to budget cuts; this led to a sharp decrease in enrollment that prompted the elimination of high school grades in 2011 after three decades as a K–12 school.

References

External links
 

Christian schools in California
Educational institutions established in 1981
Private middle schools in California
Private elementary schools in California
Schools in Ventura County, California
Buildings and structures in Camarillo, California
1981 establishments in California